Non-timber forest products (NTFPs) are useful foods, substances, materials and/or commodities obtained from forests other than timber. Harvest ranges from wild collection to farming. They typically include game animals, fur-bearers, nuts, seeds, berries, mushrooms, oils, sap, foliage, pollarding, medicinal plants, peat, mast, fuelwood, fish, insects, spices, and forage. Overlapping concepts include non-wood forest products (NWFPs), wild forest products, minor forest produce, special, minor, alternative and secondary forest products – for further distinctions see the definition section below

Research on NTFPs has focused on their ability to be produced as commodities for rural incomes and markets, as an expression of traditional knowledge or as a livelihood option for rural household needs, as a key component of sustainable forest management and conservation strategies, and for their important role in improving dietary diversity and providing nutritious food, particularly for forest-proximate peoples. All research promotes forest products as valuable commodities and tools that can promote the conservation of forests.

NTFPs in particular highlight forest products which are of value to local people and communities, but have been overlooked in the wake of forest management priorities (for example, timber production and animal forage). For example, some 2.4 billion people – in both urban and rural settings – use wood-based energy for cooking. Different communities are involved in collecting and using forest NTFPs, often with different minority communities or gender roles determining how they are used.

In recent decades, interest has grown in using NTFPs as alternatives or supplements to forest management practices. In some forest types, under the right political and social conditions, forests can be managed to increase NTFP diversity, and consequently, to increase biodiversity and potentially economic diversity. Black truffle cultivation in the Mediterranean area is highly profitable when well managed.

Definitions
The wide variety of NTFPs includes mushrooms, huckleberries, ferns, transplants, seed cones, pine nuts, tree nuts, moss, maple syrup, cork, cinnamon, rubber, wild pigs, tree oils and resins, and ginseng. The United Kingdom's Forestry Commission defines NTFPs as "any biological resources found in woodlands except timber", and Forest Harvest, part of the Reforesting Scotland project, defines them as "materials supplied by woodlands - except the conventional harvest of timber". These definitions include wild and managed game, fish, and insects. NTFPs are commonly grouped into categories such as floral greens, decoratives, medicinal plants, foods, flavors and fragrances, fibers, and saps and resins.

Non-wood forest products 
Non-wood forest products (NWFPs) are a subset of NTFP; they exclude woodfuel and wood charcoal. Both NWFP and NTFP include wild foods. Worldwide, around 1 billion people depend to some extent on wild foods such as wild meat, edible insects, edible plant products, mushrooms and fish, which often contain high levels of key micronutrients. Several million households world-wide depend on NWFPs for income, and these products may be particularly important for local economies. On a global scale, FAO estimates that NWFPs generated US$88 billion in 2011. Some 80 percent of the population of the developing world use NWFPs, mostly plant-based, for health. The value of forest foods as a nutritional resource is not limited to low- and middle-income countries; more than 100 million people in the European Union (EU) regularly consume wild food.

Land conversion, pollution and overharvesting threaten wild species and collectors' lives and livelihoods in many regions of the world. For instance, one in five medicinal and aromatic plant species have been found to be threatened with extinction, yet only 7 percent of MAPs have been assessed for the IUCN Red List of Threatened Species (TRAFFIC, 2018). Data and information on NWFPs is incomplete yet essential to monitor their status in the wild, their contribution to food and nutrition security and for traceability across the supply chain.

Other groupings or names for these types of forest products include wild forest products, minor forest produce, special, minor, alternative and secondary forest products. The term non-wood forest products (NWFP) differs from NTFP in that it does not include woodfuel or wood charcoal. The terminology debate on NWFPs has persisted for decades, although steps have been taken to disentangle the different terms and definitions for improved forest statistics.

Uses 
The harvest of NTFPs remains widespread throughout the world. People from a wide range of socioeconomic, geographical, and cultural contexts harvest NTFPs for a number of purposes, including household subsistence, maintenance of cultural and familial traditions, spiritual fulfilment, physical and emotional well-being, house heating and cooking, animal feeding, indigenous medicine and healing, scientific learning, and income. Other terms synonymous with harvesting include wild-crafting, gathering, collecting, and foraging. NTFPs also serve as raw materials for industries ranging from large-scale floral greens suppliers and pharmaceutical companies to microenterprises centered upon a wide variety of activities (such as basket-making, woodcarving, and the harvest and processing of various medicinal plants).

More than 28,000 plant species are currently recorded as being of medicinal use and many of them are found in forest ecosystems. Visits to forest environments can have positive impacts on human physical and mental health and many people have a deep spiritual relationship to forests.

Economic importance
Estimate the contribution of NTFPs to national or regional economies is difficult, broad-based systems for tracking the combined value of the hundreds of products that make up various NTFP industries are lacking. One exception to this is the maple syrup industry, which in 2002 in the US alone yielded  worth US$D 38.3 million. In temperate forests such as in the US, wild edible mushrooms such as matsutake, medicinal plants such as ginseng, and floral greens such as salal and sword fern are multimillion-dollar industries. Others with documented trade data include Brazil nuts, bamboo, honey, chestnuts, and gum Arabic, among others. While these high-value species may attract the most attention, a diversity of NTFPs can be found in most forests of the world, many of which remain invisible in official statistics.

In tropical forests, for example, NTFPs can be an important source of income that can supplement farming and/or other activities.  A value analysis of the Amazon rainforest in Peru found that exploitation of NTFPs could yield higher net revenue per hectare than would timber harvest of the same area, while still conserving vital ecological services. Their economic, cultural, and ecological values, when considered in aggregate, make managing NTFPs an important component of sustainable forest management and the conservation of biological and cultural diversity.

Impacts on people

Gendered differences 
Both men and women are involved in collection and sale of NWFPs – and have different knowledge on different products, although women tend to collect forest foods to supplement the nutrition of their households – empowering them has important spill-over effects on households'/communities' nutrition. For part-time (unpaid) collection of woodfuel for rural uses, women account for almost 80 percent of all labour and a significantly higher proportion than this in Africa and Latin America and the Caribbean.

In ethnic minority communities

Minority people in Vietnam, Myanmar, and Laos live away from mainstream settlements. The hill tribes and many other minority groups are closely associated with forests for centuries. Much of their household subsistence and part of the income is generated from the sale of a variety of NTFP products. In the highlands of Vietnam, NTFPs production is spread almost throughout the year, so provides a sustained income for the ethnic minority people. From June to August is the wild berry called uoi (Scaphium macropodium) collection that provides the bulk of household income. Every family sends several people into the forest on a regular basis during this period where they stay for 2–3 days during which 5–6 kg of berries are collected. A kilogram of dried berries (2–3 days of sun-dry) is sold for $1.50. The next comes bamboo shoots, mushrooms, and vegetable collection that goes through to February. The minority people in Sa Pa area depends mainly on a variety of NTFPs for their livelihoods. Among the products collected are fruits, berries, leaves, mushrooms, fish, bees honey, bamboo shoots, wild orchids and the list goes on. The Friday market is full of orchids and other wild plants put forward by these people for the tourists, both domestic and international, that flock there. Between 10-15% of the total household income is derived from the sale of NTFPs. The harvesting of leaves in the diet of family goes round the year where different species are readily available in specific months. Water from forest areas is yet another service that is useful in the livelihoods of these people. They have micro-hydro plants installed in streams that generate the much needed power for pounding (grain and seeds) and lighting too.

In the drier areas of Sri Lanka, the harvesting of curry leaves to be sold to traders is an important income. The harvesting of velvet tamarind (Dialium ovoideum) is an important income source to the rural people. This tree which is endemic to the country provides a fruit that has a high-popularity during certain months of the year. The returns from the sale of condoms these two products is an important addition to the household incomes of rural people.

Research
Research on NTFPs has focused on three perspectives: NTFPs as a commodity with a focus on rural incomes and markets, as an expression of traditional knowledge or as a livelihood option for rural household needs, and finally, as a key component of sustainable forest management and conservation strategies. These perspectives promote forest products as valuable commodities and important tools that can promote the conservation of forests. In some contexts, the gathering and use of NTFPs can be a mechanism for poverty alleviation and local development.

See also

 Bioproducts
 Ethnobotany
 Countermeasures in LULUCF
 Ecotourism in the Amazon rainforest
 Rural crafts
Waste valorization

Sources

References

Further reading
 Delang, Claudio O. 2006. The Role of Wild Food Plants in Poverty Alleviation and Biodiversity Conservation in Tropical Countries. Progress in Development Studies 6(4): 275-286
 Emery, Marla and Rebecca J. McLain; (editors).  2001.  Non-Timber Forest Products: Medicinal Herbs, Fungi, Edible Fruits and Nuts, and Other Natural Products from the Forest.  Food Products Press: Binghamton, New York.
 Guillen, Abraham; Laird, Sarah A.; Shanley, Patricia; Pierce, Alan R. (editors). 2002. Tapping the Green Market: Certification and Management of Non-Timber Forest Products. Earthscan
 Jones, Eric T. Rebecca J. McLain, and James Weigand. eds. 2002. Non Timber Forest Products in the United States. Lawrence: University Press of Kansas.
 Mohammed, Gina H. 2011. The Canadian NTFP Business Companion: Ideas, Techniques and Resources for Small Businesses in Non-Timber Forest Products & Services.  Candlenut Books: Sault Ste Marie, Ontario

External links

 FAO Nonwood Forest Products Website
 Nontimber Forest Products in Alaska
 Northern Forest Diversification Centre
 NTFP.org
 Virginia Tech Non-Timber Forest Products

 
Forestry
Sustainable forest management
Sustainable agriculture
Sustainable products